Although the Hungarian Revolution of 1956 failed in its efforts to oust the ruling Communist government of Hungary, the uprising provided inspiration for many artists, writers, poets, composers and filmmakers.

Film

Many movies and documentaries have been made about the revolution. They include:

 The Forgotten Faces (1961), a short directed by Peter Watkins, filmed on the streets of Canterbury, England, which re-creates events from the revolution to great realistic effect.
 Szerelem (1971), directed by Károly Makk, which tells the story of an old woman and her daughter-in-law, and the effects on them of their son/husband's imprisonment during the revolution and of his return home from prison. 
 Sunshine (1999) by István Szabó covers the 1956 Revolution among other historical periods in Hungary. 
 Réka Pigniczky's 2006 film Journey Home (Hazatérés), which tells the story of two sisters who try to find out what their father did as a freedom fighter during the Hungarian revolution of 1956. The story unfolds as the women take their father’s ashes from the U.S. to Hungary to fulfill his dying request to be buried in his native land.

A number films have also dealt with the famous Hungary-USSR water polo match at the 1956 Olympics, including  Freedom's Fury, produced by Quentin Tarantino.
Szabadság, szerelem (Children of Glory) A 2006 semi-fictional film by Hungarian director Kriszta Goda, depicting the effect of the 1956 Revolution on members of the 1956 Hungarian Olympic water polo team. A few weeks after Revolution was crushed, the Hungarian players find themselves up against the Soviet Union at a semifinal match.

Music
Dmitri Shostakovich's Eleventh Symphony, written in 1957, although subtitled "The Year 1905" and purporting to be a musical description of the ill-fated democratic uprising in Russia in that year, is often considered a commentary on the events in Hungary. Shostakovich makes frequent use of early 20th-century Russian revolutionary songs about the cruelty of the Tsar and the longing for freedom, and vividly depicts the violent crushing of the 1905 revolution. To Soviet audiences of the time, the analogy with the Hungarian revolution was unmistakable.

"Avanti ragazzi di Buda" was published on 1966 by Pier Francesco Pingitore.

Chess, a musical by Benny Andersson and Björn Ulvaeus, with lyrics by Ulvaeus and Tim Rice, and book by Rice, references the uprising with the song "1956 - Budapest Is Rising".

Literature
James Michener wrote the novel The Bridge at Andau while living in Austria during the period of the Hungarian Revolution of 1956. He witnessed the wave of refugees who fled Hungary in November 1956 after the Soviet invasion and the arrests that followed. The book, one of Michener’s earliest works, describes the events before and after the uprising, based upon interviews with eyewitnesses, but characters' names are fictional to protect them and their families left in Hungary.

References

Hungarian culture
Hungarian Revolution of 1956
Hungarian Revolution of 1956 fiction